All the Way to Paris  is a 1965 South African comedy film directed by Jamie Uys and starring Uys, Bob Courtney and Reinet Maasdorp.

It was the first South African film to be filmed overseas.

Premise
International diplomats take part in a walking competition, heading towards a major conference in Paris.

Cast
 Jamie Uys - Igor Strogoff 
 Bob Courtney - Granger J. Wellborne 
 Reinet Maasdorp - Tanya Orloff
 Angus Neill - Johnny Edwards 
 Joe Stewardson - Ed Sloane 
 Arthur Swemmer - Anzonia 
 Frank Gregory - Italian Mayor 
 Mimmo Poli - Italian Butcher 
 Marjorie Gordon - Matron 
 Emil Nofal - TV Announcer 
 Sann De Lange - Yugoslav Mother 
 Wilhelm Esterhuizen - Austrian Farmer 
 Victor Ivanoff - Chief of the Russian Delegation 
 Keith Stanners-Bloxam - Chief of the American Delegation 
 Ricky Arden - Russian Delegate

References

External links
 

1965 films
1965 comedy films
Afrikaans-language films
1960s English-language films
English-language South African films
Films directed by Jamie Uys
South African comedy films
1967 comedy films
1967 films
1960s multilingual films
South African multilingual films